Nammoora Mandara Hoove is a 1996 Indian Kannada-language film directed by Sunil Kumar Desai starring Shiva Rajkumar, Ramesh Aravind and Prema in lead roles. It's considered one of the all-time blockbuster romantic movies in Kannada Film Industry.
The film received two awards at the 1996–97, Karnataka State Film Awards including Best Child Actor – Male for Master Vinayak Joshi and Best Female Playback Singer for K. S. Chithra.

The film was also a milestone movie in the career of its lead actors Shiva Rajkumar, Ramesh Arvind and Prema. It was a huge success at the box-office. The music composition by Ilaiyaraaja was received with much accolades with the songs continuing to frequently play in the air waves. Following a 22-week run in Bangalore, it was screened in a few screens in the United States. The film was remade in Tamil language as Kangalin Vaarthaigal.

Plot
Manoj (Shiva Rajkumar) is a film director, whose father is a singer and Music composer. He tells his producer (Avinash) that he plans to visit different locations for his forthcoming film. He decides to go to Karwar, which is 322 miles north west of Bangalore, in the Uttara Kannada district of Karnataka. He then plans to stay with Praveen (Ramesh), a close friend, who lives in Yellapur, also in Uttara in order to see the location, and to shoot the location on video. Praveen says that Pramod Hegde is the best person to guide him.

Next day, Manoj goes for a walk by the beautiful Satoddi Waterfalls, where he hears a girl with a beautiful voice. He films her, but when she sees him, she runs off. Then he meets a young lad, Deepu (Master Vinayak Joshi), to whom he shows the girl he has filmed in his video camera, and asks who she is. He tells her that she is his sister, Suma (Prema). Manoj is intrigued by the girl, and the sound of her voice. He gradually falls in love with her. He meets Shivram Dixit, her singing teacher, and Praveen's friend, Pramod who is to be his guide. Then Praveen introduces him to Suma ? they look at each other, with love in their eyes.

There is a cry, Deepu has fallen in the well. Everyone runs to the well, and Manoj and Pramod jump in to save him. Manoj gives him artificial respiration, and everyone is relieved when he finally breathes again. Suma signals her gratitude to Manoj. They decide to go for a picnic to Yana, a place famous for two massive black, crystalline limestone rock outcrops, the Bhairaveshwara Shikhara and the smaller Mohini Shikhara. They take Suma, Praveen, Sudha (Praveen?s sister), Pramod and Maruthi (Praveen's servant). Manoj tells Suma that he loves her, and Suma begins to gradually fall in love with Manoj.
Another girl, Jaji, arrives on the scene. Maruthi (to whom her father had promised her in marriage) had told her father that he had seen her out with Mahadev, whom she says she loves. Her back is bruised, where her father had beaten her because of what Maruthi had told him.

Manoj tells Praveen that Suma could become a very famous singer. He says he will make a recording of her voice, and send it to his father. Praveen is delighted, and so is Suma. He also sends a video cassette of her to his mother, and later tells her that she is the girl he wants to marry. However, Praveen starts to behave differently way. Sudha, his sister realises that Praveen has loved Suma for a long time, but has never told her of his love for her, and Sudha tells him that she is going to tell Manoj but Praveen makes her promise not to tell anybody. Manoj overhears this conversation and decides to sacrifice his love for Praveen but Praveen also decides to sacrifice his love for Manoj. Who will marry Suma?

Cast
 Shiva Rajkumar as Manoj
 Ramesh Arvind as Praveen Bhat
 Prema as Suma
 Suman Nagarkar as Sudha, Praveen's sister
 Renukamma Murugodu as Kamalamma, Suma's grandmother
 Sanketh Kashi as Maruthi
Sudhakar Bannanje as Tabla Player 
Praveen Rao as Pramod Hegde, Relative of Praveen bhat 

 Kavana as Jaaji
Bharath Bhagavathar 
Kaminidharan as Praveen's Mother 
Ramesh Bhat as Shivarama Dixit, Music Teacher 
 Master Vinayak Joshi as Deepu, Suma's brother
 Kishori Ballal as Manoj's mother
 Sripathi Ballal as Manoj's father
 Avinash in a cameo appearance

Production
The entire movie was shot without a screenplay. It is a true story of one of the Sunil Kumar Desai's assistant directors. The film was entirely shot at Yana, Yellapura, Yekkambi, Sirsi and Banavasi in Uttara Kannada district of Karnataka.

Soundtrack

Ilaiyaraaja composed the background score for the film and the soundtracks. The lyrics for the soundtracks were penned by K. Kalyan, V. Manohar, S.M.Patil and Doddarange Gowda. The album consists of seven soundtracks. The album was well received and is considered a major contributor in the film's success. All the songs were retained in the Tamil remake version.

Impact
 Sunil Kumar Desai attained cult status after this movie.
 The place Yana became a famous tourist spot after this movie.
 Ramesh Arvind earned the name Thyagaraja after the character he played in this movie.
 Shivarajkumar's cap "Mandara" became very famous and "Mandara" became brand for cap and bags for a few years.
 Ramesh and Shivarajkumars Wishing style "hey hey"- "ho ho" is even stands a brand identity for their friendship.
 Locality of the Uttara kannada and the Havyaka kannada, a type of Kannada language which is used in the movie became more popular after the movie's success.

References

External links
 

1997 films
1990s Kannada-language films
Kannada films remade in other languages
Films scored by Ilaiyaraaja
Films set in Karnataka
Films shot in Karnataka
Indian romantic drama films
Buddy drama films
Films directed by Sunil Kumar Desai